Amal El-Mohtar (born 13 December 1984) is a Canadian poet and writer of speculative fiction. She has published short fiction, poetry, essays and reviews, and has edited the fantastic poetry quarterly magazine Goblin Fruit since 2006.

El-Mohtar began reviewing science fiction and fantasy books for the New York Times Book Review in February 2018. She has worked as a creative writing instructor at Carleton University and the University of Ottawa. In 2018 she also served as a host on Brandon Sanderson's creative writing podcast Writing Excuses for Season 13.

Personal life
El-Mohtar was born in Ottawa, Ontario to a family of Lebanese descent. She grew up in Ottawa, with the exception of two years spent in Lebanon beginning when she was six years old.

She is married and lives in Ottawa.

Awards and honors

El-Mohtar has also received the Rhysling Award for Best Short Poem in 2009, 2011 and 2014.

Selected works
El-Mohtar's full bibliography includes an extensive list of short stories, poems, essays, and reviews. Her most notable works include a short story collection and novella.
 The Honey Month, collected short fiction, Papaveria Press 2010; 
This Is How You Lose the Time War (with Max Gladstone), novella, 2019;

Notes

References

External links

"Seasons of Glass and Iron", winner of the Hugo, Nebula and Locus awards in 2016-17

Living people
Canadian women poets
Canadian science fiction writers
Canadian fantasy writers
Rhysling Award for Best Short Poem winners
Women science fiction and fantasy writers
Nebula Award winners
Hugo Award-winning writers
Canadian people of Lebanese descent
Academic staff of the University of Ottawa
Writers from Ottawa
Academic staff of Carleton University
Year of birth missing (living people)
Place of birth missing (living people)
21st-century Canadian poets
21st-century Canadian short story writers
21st-century Canadian novelists
21st-century Canadian women writers
1984 births